The Balmain Rugby Football Club is an Australian rugby union football club, based in Balmain, Sydney, New South Wales. The original club established in 1873 is one of the oldest rugby clubs in Australia. Balmain was one of the founding members in 1874 of the Southern Rugby Union, later renamed the New South Wales Rugby Union, which was the first governing body for the sport in the Southern Hemisphere. Billy Murdoch, who would later go on to captain the Australian cricket team, was Balmain's first captain, and he represented the club at the Southern Rugby Union's formation.

Over the years, Balmain has provided several players who have represented Australia in international rugby, including Bob Craig, Robert Graves, and Herbert Moran, who was captain of the 1908 Australian side and served as Balmain's president in 1911-12. Bill McKell who would later become Australia's Governor General also played for Balmain in 1909-10.

More recently, international players including Wallabies Drew Mitchell, Matt Giteau, Matt Dunning and Ryan Cross, and French representative Sébastien Chabal have all played for the club run by Warren Livingstone, re-established in 2005.

Balmain currently competes in the New South Wales Suburban Rugby Union competition and won the first grade premiership Kentwell Cup in 2013, shared with St Patrick's Rugby Club after a 33-all extra-time draw. The club won the Kentwell Cup two years later with a 43–29 win over Knox in the 2015 Grand Final.

References

Bibliography

 
 

Rugby union teams in Sydney
Rugby clubs established in 1873
1873 establishments in Australia
Balmain, New South Wales